This is a list of mountains of the Swiss canton of Glarus. Glarus is a very mountainous canton and lies entirely within the Alps. It is also one of the five cantons having summits above 3,600 metres. Topographically, the most important summit of the canton is that of the Tödi (most elevated, most prominent and most isolated).

This list only includes significant summits with a topographic prominence of at least . There are over 40 such summits in Glarus and they are found in all its three municipalities. All mountain heights and prominences on the list are from the largest-scale maps available.

List

References

Glarus